Herzstück Basel is a planned underground rail tunnel through the Swiss city of Basel.

Background
Planned since the 1980s, Herzstück Basel would provide a more direct connection between Basel Badischer Bahnhof and Basel SBB via two new underground stations, "Basel Mitte" and "Basel Klybeck". Currently, trains between the two stations take a meandering route through the city. In 2019, the cost of the project was estimated to be 3.2 billion Swiss francs. The cantons of Basel-Stadt and Basel-Landschaft have provided 30 million Swiss francs to fund a study into the proposal.

See also
 CEVA rail - a similar cross-border underground rail project linking Geneva with Annemasse

References

External links
 Official site

Rail infrastructure in Switzerland
Underground commuter rail
Railway tunnels in Switzerland